Rotherham Archives and Local Studies Service holds the archives for the town of Rotherham. The archives are held at the Clifton Park Museum, Clifton Lane, Rotherham, and run by Rotherham Metropolitan Borough Council.

References

County record offices in England
Rotherham
History of Yorkshire